Eleanor Gwendoline Hollington, née Paxton (1 February 1919 – 12 June 2014) was a Cambridge graduate in Modern and Medieval Languages who worked as a civilian translator for the Government Code and Cypher School at Bletchley Park from 1941 to 1945.

Biography
Born on 1 February 1919, Gwen Paxton won a scholarship to Roedean School and went on to study French and German at Girton College, Cambridge. During her studies, she spent a year at the University of Freiburg to improve her German. At Cambridge, she earned blues in lacrosse and lawn tennis.

In an interview in 2011, she stated: "Before the war I had lived in Germany for a year studying at Freiburg as part of my degree and I made a lot of friends. A lot of the Germans I knew were charming, so it was difficult to think of them as the enemy."

Upon graduation she was recruited to work as a civilian translator at Hut 4, Bletchley Park, translating decrypted German naval communications into English. She worked there for four years, while billeted with a family in Woburn Sands.

After the war, she worked for a publishing company as a literary assistant. She married Barrie Hollington (died 1964), with whom she had five children. She died on 12 June 2014.

References

People educated at Roedean School, East Sussex
Alumni of Girton College, Cambridge
University of Freiburg alumni
Bletchley Park people
German–English translators
Women in publishing
1919 births
2014 deaths
20th-century British translators
20th-century British women writers
Bletchley Park women